Handball contests at the 2011 European Youth Summer Olympic Festival were held from July 25, 2011 to July 29, 2011. Competitions for boys were played at the Çarşıbaşı Arena and for the girls at the Vakfıkebir Arena in Trabzon, Turkey. Eight nations each for boys and girls took part at the event.

Medal summary

Medal table

Medalist events

Boys

Group round

Group A

Group B

Final round

Girls

Group round

Group A

Group B

Final round

References

European Youth Summer Olympic Festival
2011 European Youth Summer Olympic Festival
European Youth Summer Olympic Festival
2011 European Youth Summer Olympics